The Argentine presidential election of 1910 was held on 13 March to choose the president of Argentina and 63 of 120 seats in the Chamber of Deputies. Roque Sáenz Peña was elected president.

Background

The ailing President Quintana's death in 1906 was the beginning of the end of Roca's dominance of national politics and policy. Moderate opposition to the PAN had greatly eroded its majorities in Congress, the very day the president died, and within months, Bartolomé Mitre and Carlos Pellegrini were dead, as well. President José Figueroa Alcorta defied Roca by signing many of Congressman Palacios' labor law reform bills and by 1909, Figueroa Alcorta was poised to nominate the reformist who had been turned away in 1892: Roque Sáenz Peña.

Other prominent conservatives, such as La Nación publisher Emilio Mitre and Buenos Aires Governor Marcelino Ugarte, presented token candidacies. Sáenz Peña, who was the Ambassador to Italy and did not campaign, was selected unanimously on April 12, 1910. He promptly began negotiations with UCR leader Hipólito Yrigoyen for the introduction of legislation providing for universal male suffrage and the secret ballot. The president struggled over the bill with a still-conservative Congress, and on 10 February 1912, the Senate narrowly passed Law 8871. Providing for free and fair elections, as well as for the country's first uniform system of voter registration, the Sáenz Peña Law brought the prolonged "vote song" to an end.

Results

President

Results by Province

Chamber of Deputies 

National Autonomist Party and its allies won all 63 seats in the election.

Notes

References
 
 
 

1910 elections in South America
1910 in Argentina
1910
Elections in Argentina